Cerro Barroso is a mountain in the Andes of Peru. It has a height of 5741 metres.

See also
List of mountains in the Andes

Mountains of Peru
Mountains of Tacna Region